Miller's striped mouse or the Liberian forest hybomys (Hybomys planifrons) is a species of rodent in the family Muridae.
It is found in Ivory Coast, Guinea, Liberia, and Sierra Leone.
Its natural habitats are subtropical or tropical dry forest, subtropical or tropical moist lowland forest, and subtropical or tropical moist montane forest.

References

Sources

Hybomys
Rodents of Africa
Mammals described in 1900
Taxonomy articles created by Polbot